The 2020 Caribbean Club Shield was originally to be the third edition of the Caribbean Club Shield (also known as the CFU Club Shield), the second-tier annual international club football competition in the Caribbean region, held amongst clubs whose football associations are affiliated with the Caribbean Football Union (CFU), a sub-confederation of CONCACAF.

The tournament was originally scheduled to be played in Curaçao between 3–12 April 2020. On 13 March 2020, CONCACAF suspended all upcoming competitions scheduled to take place over the next 30 days due to the COVID-19 pandemic, with the new dates of the tournament to be confirmed later. On 7 August 2020, they provided an update on the tournament, where they would make a final decision by the end of August to determine if it could be played in mid-September. On 25 August 2020, CONCACAF announced that as it was impossible to organize the tournament in September in order to provide qualification for the 2020 CONCACAF League which would start in October, the tournament was cancelled.

The winners of the 2020 CONCACAF Caribbean Club Shield, as long as they fulfill the CONCACAF Regional Club Licensing criteria, would originally play against the fourth place team of the 2020 CONCACAF Caribbean Club Championship in a playoff match to determine the final Caribbean spot to the 2020 CONCACAF League.

Robinhood were the title holders, but did not qualify for the tournament.

Teams

Among the 31 CFU member associations, 27 of them were classified as non-professional leagues and each may enter one team in the CONCACAF Caribbean Club Shield. A total of 15 teams (from 15 associations) entered the 2020 CONCACAF Caribbean Club Shield.

Associations which did not enter a team

Venues
The matches were originally to be played at the Ergilio Hato Stadium and Stadion dr. Antoine Maduro in Willemstad.

Group stage
The draw for the group stage was held on 13 February 2020, 11:00 EST (UTC−5), at the CONCACAF Headquarters in Miami, United States. The 15 teams were drawn into four groups: three groups of four teams and one group of three teams. The team from the host association Curaçao, Vesta, were allocated to position A1, while the remaining 14 teams were drawn into the other group positions without any seeding.

The winners of each group would advance to the semi-finals.

All times local, AST (UTC−4).

Group A

Group B

Group C

Group D

Knockout stage

Bracket
The semi-final matchups would be:
SF1: Group B Winners vs. Group D Winners
SF2: Group A Winners vs. Group C Winners
The winners of SF1 and SF2 would play in the final, while the losers of SF1 and SF2 would play in the third place match.

Semi-finals

Third place match

Final
Winners would advance to CONCACAF League playoff against 2020 CONCACAF Caribbean Club Championship fourth-placed team for a place in 2020 CONCACAF League preliminary round, as long as they comply with the minimum CONCACAF Club Licensing requirements for the CONCACAF League.

See also
2020 Caribbean Club Championship
2020 CONCACAF League
2021 CONCACAF Champions League

References

External links
Caribbean Club Shield, CONCACAF.com

2020
2
2020 CONCACAF League
International association football competitions hosted by Curaçao
Association football events cancelled due to the COVID-19 pandemic